Theta Piscium, Latinized from θ Piscium, is a single, orange-hued star in the zodiac constellation of Pisces, the fish. The annual parallax shift of this star was measured during the Hipparcos mission as 21.96 mas, which yields a distance estimate of about 149 light years. It is a faint star but visible to the naked eye with an apparent visual magnitude of 4.27. The star is moving away from the Sun with a radial velocity of +6 km/s.

At the estimated age of 2.5 billion years, this is an aging giant star with a stellar classification of K1 III, which means it has exhausted the supply of hydrogen at its core. It is a red clump star, indicating it is on the horizontal branch of its evolution and is generating energy through helium fusion at its core. Theta Piscium has 158% of the Sun's mass and its outer atmosphere has swollen to about 11 times the girth of the Sun. It is brighter yet cooler than the Sun, radiating 51.3 times the Sun's luminosity from its enlarged photosphere at an effective temperature of about 4,684 K.

Naming

References

K-type giants
Horizontal-branch stars
Pisces (constellation)
Piscium, Theta
BD+05 5173
Piscium, 010
220954
115830
8916